Galib may refer to:

Galib ibn Abd al-Rahman (c. 900 – 981), military commander in the ʿUmayyad caliphate of Córdoba
Asadulla Al Galib (born 1998), Bangladeshi cricketer
Eudaldo Báez Galib, Puerto Rican politician and former senator
Gurcharan Singh Galib, Indian politician
Haider Galib (1958–1983), Yemeni plastic artist from Akaba, Taiz Governorate
İsmail Galib, numismatist in the Ottoman Empire
Galib Israfilov (born 1975), Azerbaijani diplomat
Galib Jafarov, Kazakh boxer of Azerbaijani descent
Galib Mammadov, Azerbaijani-Norwegian composer
Ali Galib Pasha (1800–1858), Ottoman statesman and diplomat

See also
Galib Kalan, village in Jagraon in Ludhiana district of Punjab State, India
Galib Ran Singh, village in Jagraon in Ludhiana district of Punjab State, India
Galeb (disambiguation)
Ghalib
Ghalibaf (disambiguation)